Soma Kolin power station is a 510-megawatt coal-fired power station in Turkey in Manisa Province, which burns lignite mined locally. The planned original site was changed after local protests. Both units were funded by Turkish banks, built by Harbin Power Equipment, are subcritical and started generating in 2019.

The project cost 1.78 billion lira. The plant is owned by Koloğlu Holding and receives capacity payments.

References

External links 

 Soma Kolin power station on Global Energy Monitor

Coal-fired power stations in Turkey